Ali Wakili (born 1960) was a senator of the Federal Republic of Nigeria from Bauchi State and retired controller of customs. Customs area controller of Tincan Island port, Seme border, and commandant of customs training school kano. He represented south Bauchi in the current 8th National Assembly before his death on March 17, 2018. Senator Wakili was the Chairman, Poverty Alleviation & Social Welfare Committee and Vice Chairman of the Air Force Committee of the 8th National Assembly.

A bye election was conducted after his death and Lawal Yahaya Gumau of the All Progressive Congress won.

The south Bauchi Senatorial District covers seven local government areas.

References

{{Nigerian Senators of the 8th National Assembly

1958 births
2018 deaths
Members of the Senate (Nigeria)
Nigerian Muslims
People from Bauchi State